1855 Korolev is a stony Flora asteroid from the inner regions of the asteroid belt, approximately 7 kilometers in diameter. Discovered in 1969, it was later named after Soviet rocket engineer Sergei Korolev.

Discovery 

Korolev was discovered by Russian astronomer Lyudmila Chernykh at the Crimean Astrophysical Observatory in Nauchnyj on 8 October 1969. On the same night, she also discovered 1856 Růžena.

Orbit and classification 

The asteroid orbits the Sun in the inner main-belt at a distance of 2.1–2.4 AU once every 3 years and 4 months (1,231 days). Its orbit has an eccentricity of 0.08 and an inclination of 3° with respect to the ecliptic.

Naming 

This minor planet was named in honor of Sergei Korolev (1907–1966), a designer, integrator, organizer and strategic planner. He was the lead Soviet rocket engineer and spacecraft designer in the Space Race between the United States and the Soviet Union during the 1950s and 1960s until his early death. The lunar and Martian craters Korolev are also named in his honour. The official  was published by the Minor Planet Center on 1 June 1975.

Physical characteristics 

Korolev is characterized as a common stony S-type asteroid.

Diameter and albedo 

According to the surveys carried out by NASA's space-based Wide-field Infrared Survey Explorer with its subsequent NEOWISE mission, Korolev measures 6.79 kilometers in diameter, and its surface has a high albedo of 0.319, while the Collaborative Asteroid Lightcurve Link assumes an albedo of 0.24 – derived from 8 Flora, the largest member and namesake of its orbital family – and calculates a diameter of 7.47 kilometers with an absolute magnitude of 12.8.

Rotation period 

In March 2008, three rotational lightcurves of Korolev were obtained from photometric observation made by astronomers James W. Brinsfield, Petr Pravec and René Roy, giving a well-defined rotation period of 4.65–4.66 hours with a brightness variation 0.75 and 0.76 magnitude, respectively. Another concurring lightcurve was published in March 2016, using sparse-in-time photometry data from the Lowell Photometric Database.

Notes

References

External links 
 Asteroid Lightcurve Database (LCDB), query form (info )
 Dictionary of Minor Planet Names, Google books
 Asteroids and comets rotation curves, CdR – Observatoire de Genève, Raoul Behrend
 Discovery Circumstances: Numbered Minor Planets (1)-(5000) – Minor Planet Center
 
 

001855
Discoveries by Lyudmila Chernykh
Named minor planets
Sergei Korolev
19691008